Kelbaker Road is a paved road in San Bernardino County, California, that serves as the primary and busiest route through the Mojave National Preserve. It also connects the communities of Kelso and Baker. Its southern terminus is at County Route 66 between Amboy and Chambless. Kelbaker Road's northern terminus is at Interstate 15 in Baker. The road then continues as California State Route 127 northward to Nevada, connecting to Nevada State Route 373, passing near Death Valley National Park.

Route description
Kelbaker Road begins at County Route 66, part of the National Trails Highway (Historic Route 66) between Amboy and Chambless. It then travels north between the Bristol Mountains on the west and the Marble Mountains to the east to its junction at Interstate 40, north of Brown Buttes. From there, Kelbaker Road continues northeast between the Granite Mountains on the west and Providence Mountains to the east, over the  Granite Pass, and then north past the eastern edge of the Kelso Dunes to the community of Kelso.

From Kelso, Kelbaker Road continues north running near the foot of the Kelso Mountains. Reaching near the foot of Kelso Peak, the road then runs northwest between the Kelso Mountains to the west and the Marl Mountains on the east. Southeast of Seventeen Mile Point, the road travels parallel to Willow Wash for a few miles. Willow Wash along this section was a part of the Mojave Road or Old Government Road to Fort Mohave.

Points of interest
Kelbaker Road is the primary route through Kelso and the Mojave National Preserve, and thus passes by or connects to points of interest such as:

 Cinder Cone National Natural Landmark
 Granite Mountains
 Kelso Depot
 Kelso Dunes

References

Roads in San Bernardino County, California